Marcel Bescos (Oloron-Sainte-Marie, 28 June 1937- Castres, 17 July 2013) is a former French rugby league player who played as prop. He was French Champion with Albi in 1962, as well as captain of the French national team.

Career
Having an impressive physique, 102 kg, Marcel Bescos essentially played most of his career for Racing Club Albi XIII before joining Limoux at the end of his career. He formed an impressive first row alongside André Vadon and Honoré Conti, he became French Champion for Albi in 1962.
When playing for France, he also made great sporting performances. When he became captain of the national team, he was part of the French squad which put Australia in check in January 1960 for a match which ended on a 8–8 tie, after the match, Johnny Raper and Reg Gasnier admitted that they never met such a strong, fast and technical prop. With Bescos, the French team won against Great Britain six times. 
After his sporting career, he became an antiquarian and a salesman at Établissements Mauriès. He died of pulmonary embolism on 17 July 2013.

Personal life
Outside his playing career, he worked as a fishmonger.

Honours
French Rugby League Championship
Winner in 1962 (Albi)
Runner-up in 1960 (Albi)

Notes

External links
Marcel Bescos profile at rugbyleagueproject.org

1937 births
2013 deaths
Deaths from pulmonary embolism
French rugby league players
Racing Club Albi XIII players
Limoux Grizzlies players
Sportspeople from Pyrénées-Atlantiques
Rugby league props
People from Oloron-Sainte-Marie
France national rugby league team players